The Kade constituency is in the Eastern region of Ghana. The member of Parliament for the constituency is  Kwabena Ohemeng-Tinyase.  He was elected on the ticket of the New Patriotic Party (NPP) during the 2016 election.

He succeeded Ofosu Asamoah  who won a majority of 11,852 votes more than candidate closest in the race, to win the constituency election to become the MP in 2012 election  

Ofosu Asamoah had represented the constituency in all previous elections in  4th Republican parliament.

See also
List of Ghana Parliament constituencies

References

Parliamentary constituencies in the Eastern Region (Ghana)